Balasaheb Desai (born as Daulatrao Shripatrao Desai on 10 March 1910 in Village Vihe, Tal Patan, Satara district) was a leading politician and social worker from Maharashtra, India and held important positions in the Maharashtra State Government as home minister, education minister, and cultural minister during the initial formation of the Maharashtra state. He was instrumental in establishing Shivaji University in Kolhapur in 1962.

Career 
Initially Desai started his law practice in Patan, Karad, Satara district. In 1940 he campaigned for election to the District Local Board and was elected president. In 1952 he was elected as the Member of the Legislative Assembly (MLA) from Patan and was re-elected in 1957. In the same year he became a state cabinet minister. He was the main minister in the bilingual state government of Bombay state as well as Maharashtra's government. He played a leading role in the Samyukta Maharashtra Movement and dealt firmly with any outbreaks of violence during their activities in Bombay. In 1960, Desai was Educational Minister of Maharashtra State. For children of the poor, those whose incomes were not more than Rs.1200/ per annum, he insured that they received an education through Economically Backward Classes (E.B.C.) facilities. In 1962 he became agriculture minister and in the same year he was asked to take on the responsibility of being the home minister.

In the history of Maharashtra government, Desai is seen as one of strongest home ministers to date. He took steps to make the Home and Police Department strong and reliable. He handled many critical situations during his term as home minister including the outbreak of violence by members of the Samyukta Maharashtra Movement in Bombay (now Mumbai).

On 11 Dec 1967 a disastrous earthquake took place in Patan. His tireless work to help the people of Maharashtra recover from the disaster was widely appreciated. He came to be known as a true leader of the poor. Journalist Pralhad Keshav Atre called him Loknete.

He was elected MLA for his constituency three times and secured a place in the cabinet of the Maharashtra government. He was Speaker of Maharashtra Vidhan Sabha from 4 July 1977 to 14 March 1978.  In 1978–79 he was president of Maharashtra Assembly.

Cooperative movement
Desai established a sugar factory called Loknete Balasaheb Desai Sahakari Sakhar Karkhana in Patan. This sugar mill was started as a cooperative to provide stability and the opportunity for growth for farmers in the region. Desai worked closely with leading cooperative leaders in Maharashtra such as: Yashwantrao Chavan, Vasantdada Patil, Gulabrao Patil among others.

Shivaji University, Kolhapur
Desai was an educational minister in the first cabinet of Maharashtra government in 1960.  He was instrumental in establishing Shivaji University in Kolhapur in 1962.  He also established Balasaheb Desai College of Arts and Science in 1969 at Patan.

References

External links 
 स्व.लोकनेते बाळासाहेब देसाई. (in Marathi)
 Balasaheb Desai College
 The Samyukta Maharashtra Movemnet (1946-1960)
  India Who's Who 1969

1910 births
1983 deaths
Bombay State politicians
Maharashtra MLAs 1960–1962
Maharashtra MLAs 1972–1978
Marathi politicians
People from Kolhapur
People from Maharashtra
Shivaji University
Speakers of the Maharashtra Legislative Assembly
Bombay State MLAs 1957–1960
Bombay State MLAs 1952–1957